Barkat Ahmad (1787 – 5 June 1858) was a sepoy mutineer and leading figure of the Indian Rebellion of 1857. Barkat Ahmad led the army of Indian rebels in the Battle of Chinhat, in Awadh region. Barkat Ahmad was a highly trained  British sepoy. He led the rebels against the British officer Sir Henry Lawrence who was then located at the Residency.

Battle of Chinhat

On 30 June 1857, Sir Henry Lawrence received information of the movement of rebels and plan of attacking Lucknow. Sir Henry Lawrence was so confident to ambush the rebel, he led the army and came out of the Residency on a buggy. The British army was composed of 300 British soldiers, 200 Indian soldiers, 200 cavalry and 13 cannons. Barkat Ahmad had anticipated this move of Britishers, hence planned for the attack near the village of Chinchat, twelve miles from Lucknow.

Barkat Ahmad led the rebel army of 5000 soldiers. He also had Ahmadullah Shah as a commander under him. A fierce battle took place at Chinhat in which Britishers retreated and were pushed backed to the Residency. Henry Lawrence was wounded by an exploding shell on 2 July and died two days later. Barkat Ahmad is a forgotten super hero in the Indian history

See also
Indian Freedom Movement
Fazl-e-Haq Khairabadi
Bakht Khan
Begum Hazrat Mahal
Siege of Lucknow
Capture of Lucknow

References

Further reading

1787 births
1858 deaths
19th-century Muslim scholars of Islam
Indian Sufi religious leaders
Revolutionaries of the Indian Rebellion of 1857
People executed by decapitation
Indian people of the Indian Rebellion of 1857